Brodie Harper (born 1 September 1981) is an Australian TV presenter.

Career

Brodie Harper is a presenter for the Nine Network's travel and lifestyle program Postcards. She is also a weather reporter for Nine News nightly news bulletin, having filled in for Livinia Nixon. She has also appeared on other Nine programs such as Hole in the Wall and 20 to One.

Brodie is the face of the Chemist Warehouse Beauty Break franchise.

Personal life
Harper is married to Heath Meldrum, and they have one daughter together.

References

External links

1981 births
Australian television presenters
Australian women television presenters
Living people